The 2002 Major League Baseball season finished with two wild-card teams contesting the World Series; the Anaheim Angels defeated the San Francisco Giants in seven games for the World Series championship. It was the first title in Angels team history. This was the first season for mlb.tv .

Standings

American League

National League

Postseason

Bracket

Statistical leaders

Batting

Team

Individual

Pitching

Team

Individual

Managers

American League

National League 

±hosted the MLB All Star Game

Awards

Other awards
Outstanding Designated Hitter Award: Ellis Burks (CLE)
Hank Aaron Award: Alex Rodriguez (TEX), American); Barry Bonds (SF), National).
Roberto Clemente Award (Humanitarian): Jim Thome (CLE).
Rolaids Relief Man Award: Billy Koch (OAK, American); John Smoltz (ATL, National).
Warren Spahn Award (Best left-handed pitcher): Randy Johnson (ARI)

Player of the Month

Pitcher of the Month

Rookie of the Month

Home Field Attendance & Payroll

See also 
 2002 Nippon Professional Baseball season

References 
 2002 Major League Baseball standings

External links 
 2002 Major League Baseball season schedule at Baseball Reference

 
Major League Baseball seasons